Samuel Anetsi also Samuel of Ani  was an Armenian historian and priest of the 12th century. Samuel is known for his writing of history and chronicles a book where he is the first author to use the Armenian Chronology. Samuel was also a disciple of Hovhannes Imastaser. According to the Penny Cyclopaedia, "Samuel of Ani wrote a concise but accurate chronological work, extending from Adam to the pontificate of Gregory Vikayaser."

Samuel was born in Ani, the ancient capital of Armenia.

References

12th-century Armenian historians